This is a list of the extreme points of Finland, the points that are farther north, south, east or west than any other location.

Northernmost Point — Nuorgam, Utsjoki, Lapland at  - also the northernmost point of the European Union 
Southernmost Point — Bogskär in the municipality of Kökar, Åland at 
 Inhabited: Utö
Southernmost Point, Mainland — Tulliniemi, Hanko at 
Westernmost Point — Märket, Hammarland, Åland at  
 Inhabited: Västerö, Eckerö 
 Signilskär used to be permanently inhabited up the 1950s, but has now only a birdwatching station.
Westernmost Point, Mainland — Kolttapahta, Enontekiö, Lapland at 
Easternmost Point — Virmajärvi, Ilomantsi at 
Inhabited: Möhkö. Hattuvaara is sometimes cited as well.
There is also a public lean-to shelter at Lakonkangas, further east.

Transportation
Only includes public transportation.

Airport:
Northernmost: Ivalo Airport
Southernmost: Mariehamn Airport
Westernmost: Mariehamn Airport
Easternmost: Joensuu Airport

Railway station:
Northernmost: Kolari railway station
Southernmost: Hanko railway station
Westernmost: Vaasa railway station
Easternmost: Uimaharju railway station

Altitude
Highest:
 The highest fell entirely in Finland is Ridnitšohkka.
Lowest:
Sea level, Baltic sea.
Lowest mine: Pyhäsalmi Mine, Pyhäjärvi municipality 1444 m below ground.

See also 

Extreme points of Earth
Geography of Finland

References 

 
Finland geography-related lists